Panniers or side hoops are women's undergarments worn in the 17th and 18th centuries to extend the width of the skirts at the side while leaving the front and back relatively flat. This provided a panel where woven patterns, elaborate decorations and rich embroidery could be displayed and fully appreciated.

History 

The style originated in Spanish court dress of the 17th century, familiar in portraits by Velázquez. The fashion spread to France and from there to the rest of Europe after c. 1718–1719, when some Spanish dresses had been displayed in Paris. It is also suggested that the pannier originated in Germany or England, having been around since 1710 in England, and appearing in the French court in the last years of Louis XIV’s reign.

The earlier form of the pannier took the shape similar to a 19th-century crinoline. They were wide and domed in circumference.  As they developed, they differed from earlier equivalents such as the farthingale of the late 16th century, by not extending equally in all directions, but being very wide at the sides, but not coming out so far to front and back.  By the mid-century, the "shoulders" were rather abrupt, not gently curved.

By the mid-18th century, a woman took up three times as much space as a man and always presented an imposing spectacle. At their most extreme, panniers could extend the skirt several feet at each side. By the 1780s, panniers were normally worn only with very formal gowns and within court fashion.

The name comes from panniers, a French term for wicker baskets slung on either side of a pack animal.

Gallery

See also
1750–1795 in fashion
Hoop skirt

References

External links

Eighteenth-Century Silhouette and Support at the Metropolitan Museum of Art
The Costumer's Manifesto: The Cut of Women's Clothes 1700–1800
Paniers

17th-century fashion
18th-century fashion
Undergarments
History of clothing (Western fashion)
History of fashion
Women's clothing